Salehabad (also Romanized as Şāleḩābād and Salāhābād; also known as Şāleḩābād-e Bālā and Şāleḩābād-e Pā’īn) is a village in Aliabad-e Malek Rural District, in the Central District of Arsanjan County, Fars Province, Iran. At the 2006 census, its population was 519, in 127 families.

References 

Populated places in Arsanjan County